In enzymology, a γ-glutamylhistamine synthase is an enzyme that catalyzes the chemical reaction

ATP + L-glutamate + histamine  products of ATP breakdown + Nα-γ-L-glutamylhistamine

The 3 substrates of this enzyme are ATP, L-glutamate, and histamine, whereas its two products are products of ATP breakdown and Nalpha-gamma-L-glutamylhistamine.

This enzyme belongs to the family of ligases, specifically those forming carbon-nitrogen bonds as acid-D-amino-acid ligases (peptide synthases).  The systematic name of this enzyme class is L-glutamate:histamine ligase. Other names in common use include gamma-glutaminylhistamine synthetase, and gamma-GHA synthetase.

References

 

EC 6.3.2
Enzymes of unknown structure